The Gazelle Formation is a geologic formation in California. It preserves fossils dating back to the Silurian period.

See also

 List of fossiliferous stratigraphic units in California
 Paleontology in California

References
 

Silurian California
Silurian System of North America
Geologic formations of California
Silurian southern paleotropical deposits